"The Banks O' Doon" (Modern Scots: The Banks o Doon) is a Scots song written by Robert Burns in 1791, sometimes known as "Ye Banks and Braes" (after the opening line of the third version). Burns set the lyrics to an air called The Caledonian Hunt's Delight. Its melodic schema was also used for Phule Phule Dhole Dhole, a song by Bengali poet Rabindranath Tagore.

The song was inspired by the story of Margaret (Peggy) Kennedy (1766—95), who was seduced and then abandoned by Andrew McDouall, the son of a wealthy family and sometime Member of Parliament for Wigtonshire. Kennedy sued for a declarator of marriage, but died prior to adjudication of the case. Although the Consistorial court found the marriage claim valid, the Court of Session decided the marriage claim failed, but found McDouall to be the father of Kennedy's daughter and ordered that he pay £3,000 to Kennedy's estate and provide for the child. (Burns wrote a second poem about Peggy, whom he had met when she was 18 - Young Peggy Blooms.)

The song uses the same tune as the East Anglian variant of the English Folk song "Foggy Dew".

Lyrics 
Burns wrote three versions of the song, all published in 1791.

References 

Poetry by Robert Burns
1790s songs
1791 in Scotland
1791 poems
Songs with lyrics by Robert Burns
Scots-language works